Navy Office can refer to:
 Navy Office (Germany), a command of the German Navy
 Navy Office (Royal Navy) a government office (that included the British Navy Board) established in 1546 in England; also its headquarters building in Whitehall, London.